"Love of a Lifetime" is a song performed by the American rock band FireHouse. It was the band's third single and its highest charting single in the United States, entering the Billboard Hot 100 June 29, 1991 at No. 81 and  peaking at No. 5 the week of September 28, 1991. It is also the band's first and most popular power ballad. The song was written by vocalist C. J. Snare and guitarist Bill Leverty.

The song is arguably what FireHouse is most known for, and has been used as a first dance song at countless weddings since its release. In a 2005 interview, Snare commented "now I have the benefit of time to look back over this and there isn't a show that goes by where people don't come up to us and are like "'Love of a Lifetime' - we got married to that song!"

Origin
The song was written by C. J. Snare; he wrote it while playing solo gigs at a Holiday Inn. When the band brought the demos for their first album to Epic Records, the label felt that the album needed a stronger ballad. Snare said "I remember raising my hand sheepishly and saying 'Well, I have a song...,' so we played it for them and they absolutely loved it and it did become a big hit."

Charts

Weekly charts

Year-end charts

Cover versions

The project Collage recorded the song in 1998 and released it as a single. It peaked at No. 4 on the Bubbling Under Hot 100 Singles chart  and was the last single released by the project.

Country singer Katie Armiger, who was coincidentally born in 1991, recorded a cover version on her eponymous first album in 2007, but did not release it as a single.

References

External links
Music Video for "Love of a Lifetime"

1990 songs
1991 singles
Collage (American duo) songs
Epic Records singles
FireHouse (band) songs
Glam metal ballads
Songs written by Bill Leverty
Songs written by C. J. Snare